The Post is a 2017 American semi-fiction historical political thriller film about The Washington Post and the publication of the Pentagon Papers. It was directed and produced by Steven Spielberg, and written by Liz Hannah and Josh Singer. It stars Meryl Streep as Katharine Graham, the publisher of the Washington Post, and Tom Hanks as Ben Bradlee, the longtime executive editor of The Washington Post, with Sarah Paulson, Bob Odenkirk, Tracy Letts, Bradley Whitford, David Cross, Bruce Greenwood, Carrie Coon, Alison Brie, and Matthew Rhys in supporting roles.

Set in 1971, The Post depicts the true story of attempts by journalists at The Washington Post to publish the infamous Pentagon Papers, a set of classified documents regarding the 20-year involvement of the United States government in the Vietnam War and earlier in French Indochina back to the 1940s.

Principal photography began in New York City in May 2017 and wrapped in July 2017. The film premiered at the Newseum in Washington, D.C., on December 14, 2017, and went into limited release in the United States on December 22, 2017. It entered wide release on January 12, 2018, and grossed $179 million worldwide.

The film received positive reviews; critics praised the performances (particularly Streep, Hanks, and Odenkirk) and the film's references and allusions to the presidencies of Richard Nixon and Donald Trump. The Post was chosen by the National Board of Review as the best film of 2017 and was named as one of the top 10 films of the year by Time magazine and the American Film Institute. The Post was nominated for Best Picture and Best Actress (for Streep) at the 90th Academy Awards, and received six nominations at the 75th Golden Globe Awards: Best Motion Picture – Drama, Best Director, Best Actress – Drama (for Streep), Best Actor – Drama (for Hanks), Best Screenplay, and Best Original Score.

Plot

In 1966, during the Vietnam War, U.S. State Department military analyst Daniel Ellsberg documents military progress for Secretary of Defense Robert McNamara alongside American troops. On their return flight, McNamara tries to convince William B. Macomber that the war is hopeless. However, Ellsberg is disillusioned to hear McNamara continue to publicly argue that the war is both justifiable and winnable. 

When Ellsberg gets a job as a contractor for the RAND Corporation, a military policy think-tank with access to classified government information, he copies thousands of pages from a top secret report on the country's extensive interference in Vietnam, which began with the Truman administration. He leaks the report to reporter Neil Sheehan at The New York Times. 

In 1971, Katharine Graham has been the owner and publisher of The Washington Post for eight years since the suicide of its former publisher (her husband Phil Graham) and the death of its former owner (her father Eugene Meyer). She hopes to financially stabilize the Post by floating it on the stock market. Although Graham lacks journalistic and business experience she strongly believes they can best improve the paper's financial health over the long-term by investing in higher-quality national news. 

Graham appointed the bullish Ben Bradlee as the Post's executive editor as they both feel the paper's provincialism is preventing it from competing with The New York Times. However, she struggles to convince the male-dominated board's key leaders, who dismiss Graham as a former housewife in over her head. The board pushes to remain a regional paper, as a lower-risk strategy works for other publishers. Simultaneously, Graham maintains her pre-Post life as a well-connected D.C. socialite. She and Bradlee frequently clash over her reluctance to publish stories critical of her friends. 

McNamara, one of Graham's long-time friends, tells her at a dinner party that an "unflattering" story about him will be published in The New York Times—another example of the Times scooping the Post in its own backyard. The story is the first of Sheehan's scoops from Ellsberg's documents: an exposé of the true origins of the U.S. government's interference in Southeast Asia. 

As the Post's editors discuss how to pursue the story further, an anonymous woman leaves one hundred pages of the leaked documents on a reporter's desk in the newsroom. Bradlee is ecstatic at a chance to finally get ahead of the Times on a major story. However, a federal district court injunction halts the Times from publishing further articles on the subject, and Graham—concerned about its potential to both open the Post to huge financial and criminal liability, and socially embarrass her—instructs Bradlee that she won't allow the Post to ignore the injunction.

Post assistant editor Ben Bagdikian tracks down Ellsberg, a former colleague at RAND, as the source. He explains how he copied the documents over years, a few pages each day, and gives Bagdikian over 4,000 pages to take back to D.C. Post reporters pore over the mounds of pages, searching for stories, as their attorneys advise against publishing them lest the Nixon administration file criminal charges. 

Graham confers with McNamara, Bradlee, Parsons, and trusted Post chairman Fritz Beebe as she agonizes over publishing the story. McNamara warns her that she will face social exile in D.C., and that Nixon's revenge on the Post will be merciless. Beebe and Parsons also warn they could lose investors. 

Bradlee argues that they have a responsibility to actively seek out risky stories for the public interest. And, if they are successful in court, the Post would emerge as a significant journalistic institution. He also tells her that his own circle of elite D.C. friends (including John F. Kennedy, as revealed in the documents) repeatedly lied to him as well over the years to garner sympathetic coverage; her own friendships with people like McNamara cannot be allowed to influence her decision.

After hearing all sides, Graham gives the go-ahead. However, the situation intensifies immediately after they go to print when the lawyers realize that Bagdikian’s source and Sheehan's is Ellsberg, putting Graham and Bradlee in contempt of court under the terms of the original injunction. This opens them to further liability under the Espionage Act, with a serious risk that Graham has just destroyed both the newspaper and her family's legacy.

The Post and Times jointly appear before the Supreme Court to plead their First Amendment rights. Meanwhile, in solidarity with the Post and Times, other major and regional newspapers also publish about the secret war study. On June 30, 1971, the Supreme Court's justices, in the case of New York Times Co. v. United States, ruled 6–3 in the two newspapers' favor, vindicating Graham's decision to print. Shortly after, President Richard Nixon bars the Post from the White House.

The film ends with a sequence showing the discovery of the Watergate burglary by security guard Frank Wills (which the Post further exposed, ultimately leading to Nixon’s resignation).

Cast

 Meryl Streep as Katharine Graham
 Tom Hanks as Ben Bradlee
 Sarah Paulson as Antoinette "Tony" Pinchot Bradlee
 Bob Odenkirk as Ben Bagdikian
 Tracy Letts as Fritz Beebe
 Bradley Whitford as Arthur Parsons
 Bruce Greenwood as Robert McNamara
 Carolyn McCormick as Mrs. McNamara
 Matthew Rhys as Daniel Ellsberg
 Alison Brie as Lally Graham
 Carrie Coon as Meg Greenfield
 Jesse Plemons as Roger Clark
 David Cross as Howard Simons
 Zach Woods as Anthony Essaye
 Michael Stuhlbarg as A. M. Rosenthal
 David Costabile as Art Buchwald
 Pat Healy as Philip L. Geyelin
 Rick Holmes as Murrey Marder
 Philip Casnoff as Chalmers Roberts
 Jessie Mueller as Judith Martin
 Stark Sands as Donald E. Graham
 Michael Cyril Creighton as Jake
 James Riordan as Vice Admiral Joseph Francis Blouin
 Kelly AuCoin as Assistant Attorney General Kevin Maroney
 Cotter Smith as William Macomber
 Jennifer Dundas as Liz Hylton
 Justin Swain as Neil Sheehan
 Will Denton as Michael (The Runner)

Production

In October 2016, Amy Pascal won a bid for the rights to the screenplay The Post, written by Liz Hannah. In February 2017, Steven Spielberg had halted pre-production on The Kidnapping of Edgardo Mortara with The Weinstein Company after a casting setback, and consequently opened his schedule to other potential films to direct. The following month, it was announced that Spielberg was in negotiations to direct and produce the film, with Meryl Streep and Tom Hanks in talks for the roles of Katharine Graham and Ben Bradlee, respectively. The Post is the first time that Spielberg, Streep, and Hanks had all worked together on a film.

Spielberg read the screenplay and decided to direct the film as soon as possible, saying that "when I read the first draft of the script, this wasn't something that could wait three years or two years — this was a story I felt we needed to tell today." Spielberg worked on The Post while post-production work continued on the visual-effects-heavy Ready Player One, a situation familiar to him from concurrently producing, in the early 1990s, Jurassic Park and Schindler's List. Josh Singer was hired to re-write the screenplay ten weeks before filming.

As filming commenced, a number of New York Times figures who were associated with the Pentagon Papers case—among them James Greenfield, James Goodale, Allan M. Siegal, and Max Frankel—objected to the film's production due to the script's lack of emphasis on the Times role in breaking the story. Goodale, who was at the time the Timess in-house counsel, later called the film "a good movie but bad history."

Filming
The film began principal photography in New York on May 30, 2017. On June 6, 2017, it was announced that the project, retitled The Papers, would also star Alison Brie, Carrie Coon, David Cross, Bruce Greenwood, Tracy Letts, Bob Odenkirk, Sarah Paulson, Jesse Plemons, Matthew Rhys, Michael Stuhlbarg, Bradley Whitford, and Zach Woods. On August 25, 2017, the film's title reverted to The Post. Spielberg finished the final cut of the film on November 6, 2017, with the final sound mix also completed along with the musical score a week later, on November 13.

Costume design
Writing for The New York Times, Manohla Dargis indicated some high points in the costume design used in the film stating, "The costume designer Ann Roth subtly brightens Katharine, taking her from leaden gray to free-flowing gold."

Music

The score for the film was written by John Williams; it is his 28th collaboration with Spielberg. The music is a combination of traditional orchestral instrumentation and what Williams has called "very light, computerised electronic effects." Williams was originally attached to write the music for Spielberg's Ready Player One, but, because both films had similar post-production schedules, Williams chose to work on The Post, while Alan Silvestri composed for Ready Player One. Spielberg has said that The Post was a rare instance in which he went to the recording sessions "having not heard a note" in advance.

Recording began on October 30, 2017, in Los Angeles. The soundtrack was released digitally by Sony Classical Records on December 22, 2017, and in physical form on January 12, 2018.

Release
The Post premiered at the Newseum in Washington, D.C. on December 14, 2017. It began a limited theatrical release in the United States on December 22, 2017, and a wide release on January 12, 2018. The film is distributed internationally through Amblin Partners' distribution agreements with Universal Pictures, Reliance Entertainment, and Entertainment One. The film was released by Reliance in India. Tom Hanks said he would not be interested in appearing at a potential White House screening for President Donald Trump.

Marketing
The first official image from The Post was released on October 31, 2017. The trailer for The Post premiered exclusively on The Late Show with Stephen Colbert, on November 7, 2017, and the film's poster, designed by BLT Communications, was released the next day. The first TV spot, titled "Uncover the Truth", was released on November 21, 2017.

Home media
The Post was released on Digital HD on April 3 and on Blu-ray/DVD on April 17, 2018, by 20th Century Fox Home Entertainment in North America and in the United Kingdom and Australia via Entertainment One.

Reception

Box office
The Post grossed $81.9 million in the United States and Canada, and $97.9 million in other territories, for a worldwide total of $179.8 million, against a production budget of $50 million.

During The Posts limited opening weekend, December 22 to 24, it grossed $526,011 (and a total of $762,057 over the four-day Christmas weekend) from nine theaters. The following weekend, the film grossed $561,080 for a per-theater average of $62,342, one of the highest of 2017. The film had its wide release alongside the openings of The Commuter, Paddington 2 and Proud Mary, and was projected to gross around $20 million from 2,819 theaters over the weekend. It made $5.9 million on its first day and $18.6 million over the weekend (and a four-day MLK weekend total of $23.4 million), finishing second at the box office behind holdover Jumanji: Welcome to the Jungle. 66% of its opening weekend audience was over the age of 35. It dropped 37% the following weekend to $12.2 million, finishing 4th behind Jumanji and newcomers 12 Strong and Den of Thieves. It dropped to 5th in its third week of wide release, grossing $8.9 million.

Critical response
On review aggregator Rotten Tomatoes, the film has an approval rating of 88% based on 409 reviews, with an average rating of 7.90/10. The website's critical consensus reads, "The Post period setting belies its bitingly timely themes, brought compellingly to life by director Steven Spielberg and an outstanding ensemble cast." On Metacritic, the film has a weighted average score of 83 out of 100, based on 51 critics, indicating "universal acclaim". Audiences polled by CinemaScore gave the film an average grade of "A" on an A+ to F scale, while PostTrak reported 63% of audience members gave the film a "definite recommend".

Alonso Duralde of TheWrap praised the acting and Spielberg's direction, though he noted the script was too on-the-nose at times, saying, "The Post passes the trickiest tests of a historical drama: it makes us understand that decisions validated by the lens of history were difficult ones to make in the moment, and it generates suspense over how all the pieces fell into place to make those decisions come to fruition." David Ehrlich of IndieWire gave the film an A− and wrote: "Nobody needs to be reminded that history tends to go in circles, but The Post is so vital because it captures the ecstasy of trying to break the chain and bend things towards justice; defending the fundamental tenets of the Constitution hasn't been this much fun since Hamilton."

Chris Nashawaty, writing for Entertainment Weekly, gave the film a positive review, but also compared it with previous journalism films such as All the President's Men stating, "Spielberg makes these crucial days in American history easy to follow. But if you look at The Post next to something like All the President's Men, you see the difference between having a story passively explained to you and actively helping to untangle it. That's a small quibble with an urgent and impeccably acted film. But it's also the difference between a very good movie and a great one."

Manohla Dargis of The New York Times awarded the film an NYT Critic's Pick with a strong acknowledgment of Spielberg as director saying, "Mostly, (the Post decision to publish) went down fast, a pace that Mr. Spielberg conveys with accelerated rhythms, flying feet, racing cameras and an enjoyably loose approach to the material. With his virtuosic, veteran crew, Mr. Spielberg paints the scene vividly and with daubs of beauty; most notably, he creates distinct visual realms for the story's two main overlapping, at times colliding, worlds. Katharine reigns over one; at first she's all but entombed in her darkly lighted, wood-paneled empire. Ben rules the other, overseeing the talking and typing warriors of the glaring, noisily freewheeling newsroom".

Matt Bobkin, writing for Exclaim!, gave the film a 6 out of 10 score, saying the film "has all the makings of an awards season hit, but is too calculated to reflect today's ragged, tenuous sociopolitical climate."

Matt Zoller Seitz of RogerEbert.com reflected on the film nearly two years after its release, noting that due to the film's accessibility and Spielberg's invisible style of direction, critics underrated the film and tended to take its story literally such as by fact-checking historical details, in spite of the film being a "coded commentary" and doubling "as a stealth portrait of the media’s responsibility in the age of Trump, and in any age."

Bob Woodward, a Washington Post journalist who reported on the Watergate scandal, expressed that the film is a "masterpiece".

Portrayal of The New York Times
The film portrays the original role that The New York Times had in breaking the Pentagon Papers and then emphasizes The Washington Post'''s subsequent involvement. In an interview with the Columbia Journalism Review, former New York Times associates James Greenfield, who coordinated the Pentagon Papers project as the Times foreign editor; James Goodale, the Times general counsel at the time; and Max Frankel, the Times Washington bureau chief when the Papers were published, criticized the film's more minor portrayal of the paper, although The New York Times is shown as publishing the Pentagon Papers before The Washington Post and having also set the stage for the major legal battle between the press and the United States government. The newspaper also won the 1972 Pulitzer Prize for Public Service for its contributions.

The 1972 Pulitzer jury of journalists noted in their recommendation not only the significance of Daniel Ellsberg's Pentagon Papers leak, but also that of Times reporters Neil Sheehan, Hedrick Smith, Fox Butterfield and E. W. Kenworthy, and stated that their effort was "a combination of investigative reporting, analysis, research, and writing — all of which added to a distinctly meritorious public service, not only for readers of The Times but also for an entire nation." Goodale noted in an article for The Daily Beast that the Times published the Papers after Ellsberg had leaked them to Sheehan, and further stated that the film "creates a false impression that the Post was a major player in such publication. It's as though Hollywood had made a movie about the Times' triumphant role in Watergate." On PBS NewsHour, Goodale further said, "Although a producer has artistic license, I think it should be limited in a situation such as this, so that the public comes away with an understanding of what the true facts are in this case . . . And I think that if you're doing a movie now, when [President Donald] Trump is picking on the press for 'fake news', you want to be authentic. You don't want to be in any way fake."

Accolades

Notes

See also
 All the President's Men: 1976 Best Picture nominee about the Post later efforts to break the Watergate scandal, with Ben Bradlee also portrayed, and which opens at the same moment in which The Post closes - Frank Wills' discovery of the Watergate break-in.
 The Most Dangerous Man in America (2009 Oscar-nominated documentary)
 The Pentagon Papers (2003 film)
 Mark Felt: The Man Who Brought Down the White House (2017 film)

References

External links
 
 
 
 
 
 
 The Post at History vs. Hollywood''

2017 films
2010s historical films
2010s legal films
2010s political thriller films
2017 thriller films
20th Century Fox films
Amblin Entertainment films
American courtroom films
American historical films
American political thriller films
Biographical films about journalists
Cold War films
DreamWorks Pictures films
2010s English-language films
Films about Richard Nixon
Films about The New York Times
Films about The Washington Post
Films about freedom of expression
Films about journalism
Films about newspaper publishing
Films about whistleblowing
Films directed by Steven Spielberg
Films produced by Amy Pascal
Films produced by Steven Spielberg
Films scored by John Williams
Films set in 1966
Films set in 1971
Films set in 1972
Films set in New York City
Films set in Vietnam
Films set in Washington, D.C.
Films set in the White House
Films shot in New York City
Films shot in New York (state)
Participant (company) films
Pentagon Papers
Political films based on actual events
Reliance Entertainment films
Universal Pictures films
Vietnam War films
Watergate scandal in film
Works about Katharine Graham
2010s American films